Vedea is a commune in Argeș County, Muntenia, Romania. It is composed of nineteen villages: Bădicea, Blejani, Burețești, Chirițești, Chițani, Ciurești, Dincani, Fata, Frătici, Izvoru de Jos, Izvoru de Sus, Lungani, Mogoșești, Prodani, Rățoi, Vața, Vârșești, Vedea and Vețișoara.

References

Communes in Argeș County
Localities in Muntenia